Singapore sent a delegation to compete at the 2008 Summer Paralympics in Beijing, represented by six athletes competing in four sports: swimming, sailing, equestrian and athletics. The country's flagbearer at the Games' opening ceremony was supposed to be Desiree Lim, a sailor. However, as the sailing events were held in Qingdao, it was Theresa Goh (swimming) who was the flagbearer on that day. The 2008 Summer Paralympics marked the first time Singapore had won a Paralympic medal of any kind.

Yip Pin Xiu won two medals for swimming; gold in the women's 50 meter backstroke S3 and silver in the women's 50 meter freestyle S3. Laurentia Tan won two bronze medals in equestrian. Due to the efforts by the medal winners, Yip was awarded the Meritorious Service Medal and Tan awarded the Public Service Medal.

Medalists

Sports

Athletics

Equestrian

Sailing

Singaporeans will compete in the following event in sailing:
Lim Kok Liang Desiree - Two-Person Keelboat - SKUD18
Tan Wei Qiang Jovin - Two-Person Keelboat - SKUD18

Swimming

Women

See also
2008 Summer Paralympics
Singapore at the Paralympics
Singapore at the 2008 Summer Olympics

References

External links

Beijing 2008 Paralympic Games Official Site
International Paralympic Committee
Team Singapore Beijing 2008 Olympics Microsite

 

Paralympics
Nations at the 2008 Summer Paralympics
2008